Symphoricarpos × chenaultii, the Chenault coralberry, is a nothospecies (hybrid) group of shrubs in the honeysuckle family. It was grown in France in 1912 as a hybrid S. microphyllus × S. orbiculatus.

References

chenaultii
Plants described in 1921
Hybrid plants